Lana Franković (born 27 September 1991) is a Croatian handball player the best Croatian handball club RK Podravka Vegeta and the Croatian national team. In 2013 Franković played on Mediterranean games in Mersin, Turkey, where Croatia won the bronze medal against Montenegro (25:24).

References

1991 births
Living people
Croatian female handball players
Sportspeople from Koprivnica
Mediterranean Games bronze medalists for Croatia
Competitors at the 2013 Mediterranean Games
Mediterranean Games medalists in handball